The Tumtum River is a  tributary of the Marys River in Benton and Lincoln counties in the U.S. state of Oregon. The river rises in the Central Oregon Coast Range west of Burnt Woods and passes through the communities of Burnt Woods and Blodgett. It then drains into the Marys River north of Alder.

The name Tumtum is a Chinook Jargon word for "heart", and the river was so-named because it was considered to be the heart of the valley through which it flowed. When the Burnt Woods post office was to be named, one of the names proposed to the Post Office Department was Tumtum.

References

Rivers of Oregon
Chinook Jargon place names
Rivers of Benton County, Oregon
Rivers of Lincoln County, Oregon
Oregon placenames of Native American origin